Secrets, released in 2004 (see 2004 in music), is the second studio album released by Allison Crowe and her first full-length CD. Following the dissolution of her trio, Crowe recorded this solo, singer-songwriter, collection in Nanaimo, British Columbia. She engineered the recording and assisted with production alongside Rainer Willeke of the Victoria, Canada-based r'n'b combo, Soul Station. Performing all vocals (lead and harmonies), piano and keyboards Crowe added acoustic guitar tracks and percussive 'thumps'.

Secrets contains 'old' fan favourites (some of which are radically redefined from earlier performances), newly penned songs, and a pair of personal picks from other artists: Counting Crows' "Raining in Baltimore" ~ the first song performed by Crowe when she launched her career as a singer-songwriter in the mid-'90s; and "Joan of Arc", a poem song from the pen of  Leonard Cohen.

Track listing
How Long (Allison Crowe) – 3:53
“Raining In Baltimore” (Adam Duritz, Steve Bowman, David Bryson, Charlie Gillingham, Dave Immergluck & Matt Malley) – 4:50
Philosophy (Allison Crowe) – 5:24
Midnight (Allison Crowe) – 3:53
Immersed (Allison Crowe) – 4:15
Secrets (That Aren't My Own) (Allison Crowe) – 6:22
Montreal (Allison Crowe) – 4:26
Sea of a Million Faces (Allison Crowe) – 3:12
What About You (Allison Crowe) – 3:52
"Joan of Arc" (Leonard Cohen) – 4:51
Whether I'm Wrong (live) (Allison Crowe) – 4:44
Believe Me, if All Those Endearing Young Charms (Traditional Irish air; words by Sir Thomas Moore) – 1:28

Personnel
Allison Crowe – vocals, piano, guitar
Del Crowe – guitar
Jo Lundstrom – accordion
Eric Reiswig – uillean pipes
Rainer Willeke – tambourine

Production
Production: Rainer Willeke & Allison Crowe
Engineer: Allison Crowe & Rainer Willeke
Art Direction: Alix Whitmire

References

External links
Allison Crowe official site
“Whether I'm Wrong” live-in-the-studio

Allison Crowe albums
2004 albums